The 2011 Oregon Ducks football team represented the University of Oregon in the 2011 NCAA Division I FBS football season. The team was led by third year head coach Chip Kelly and played their home games at Autzen Stadium for the 45th straight year. They are a member of the Pac-12 Conference in the North Division.

The Ducks won their third straight Pac-12 championship title after defeating UCLA in the inaugural Pac-12 Football Championship Game. They represented the Pac-12 in the Rose Bowl, where they defeated Wisconsin 45–38 to win their first Rose Bowl Championship since 1917. It was their second Rose Bowl appearance in three years and their sixth overall. This would be Oregon's third consecutive year in a BCS bowl game. The Ducks finished the season 12–2 (8–1 Pac-12).

Previous season
In 2010, The Ducks repeated as Pac-10 Conference champions, were at one time ranked number one in all of the major media polls and BCS rankings for the first time ever, and finished the regular season undefeated with a school-record 12 wins—the first undefeated and untied regular season in the school's 117-year football history. They earned a berth in the BCS National Championship Game, which they narrowly lost to Auburn on a field goal as time expired.

Before the season

Recruiting

Schedule

University of Oregon official schedule

Game summaries

LSU

On September 3, Oregon lost to LSU 40–27, due in part to losing 4 turnovers while only forcing 1 LSU turnover. LSU was able to score after three of those turnovers, which led to 20 points, and built a 30–13 lead before the end of the third quarter. Oregon freshman running back De'Anthony Thomas fumbled on consecutive Oregon possessions late in the third quarter, one on a rushing attempt and then on the ensuing kickoff. The Tigers scored touchdowns as a result of both turnovers with runs from Michael Ford and Spencer Ware in a span of less than 4 minutes. Oregon outgained LSU in total offensive yards 335 to 273 during the game.

1st quarter scoring: LSU – Drew Alleman 44 Yd Field Goal; ORE –  Yd Reception; Josh Huff 29 ORE – Beard 30 Yd Field Goal

2nd quarter scoring: LSU – Tyrann Mathieu 3 Yd Fumble Return (Pat Failed); ORE – LaMichael James 3 Yd Run (Beard Kick); LSU – Rueben Randle 10 Yd Pass From Jarrett Lee (Alleman Kick)

3rd quarter scoring: LSU – Michael Ford 5 Yd Run (Alleman Kick); LSU – Spencer Ware 1 Yd Run (Alleman Kick)

4th quarter scoring: LSU – Alleman 32 Yd Field Goal; ORE – Marshawn Lacy 8 Yd Pass From Darron Thomas (Beard Kick); LSU – Michael Ford 16 Yd Run (Alleman Kick); ORE – De'Anthony Thomas 4 Yd Run (Beard Kick)

Nevada

1st quarter scoring: ORE – LaMichael James 4 Yd Run (Two-Point Run Conversion Failed); ORE – Lavasier Tuinei 3 Yd Pass From Darron Thomas (Alejandro Maldonado Kick)

2nd quarter scoring: ORE – LaMichael James 44 Yd Pass From Darron Thomas (Maldonado Kick); ORE – Marshawn Lacy 70 Yd Touchdown Pass From Darron Thomas (Maldonado Kick); ORE – Colt Lyerla 20 Yd Pass From Darron Thomas (Maldonado Kick); NEV – Mike Ball 5 Yd Pass From Tyler Lantrip (Anthony Martinez Kick); ORE – De'Anthony Thomas 24 Yd Pass From Darron Thomas (Maldonado Kick)

3rd quarter scoring: ORE – LaMichael James 58 Yd Punt Return (Maldonado Kick); NEV – Stefphon Jefferson 1 Yd Run (Pat Failed); ORE – De'Anthony Thomas 69 Yd Pass From Darron Thomas (Maldonado Kick)

4th quarter scoring: NEV – Cody Fajardo 7 Yd Run (Martinez Kick); ORE – Ayele Forde 26 Yd Run (Maldonado Kick); ORE – Boseko Lokombo 67 Yd Interception Return (Maldonado Kick)

Missouri State

1st quarter scoring: MOSU – Chris Douglas 3 Yd Run (Austin Witmer Kick); ORE – LaMichael James 1 Yd Run (Alejandro Maldonado Kick); ORE – Lavasier Tuinei 8 Yd Pass From Darron Thomas (Maldonado Kick)

2nd quarter scoring: ORE – Colt Lyerla 7 Yd Pass From Darron Thomas (Maldonado Kick); ORE – LaMichael James 90 Yd Run (Maldonado Kick); ORE – Lavasier Tuinei 34 Yd Pass From Darron Thomas (Maldonado Kick)

3rd quarter scoring: ORE – LaMichael James 50 Yd Run (Maldonado Kick) — ORE – Colt Lyerla 26 Yd Pass From Bryan Bennett (Maldonado Kick); ORE – Eric Dungy 22 Yd Pass From Bryan Bennett Maldonado Kick)

4th quarter scoring:

Arizona

Oregon's 56 points is the most points Arizona has allowed at home since LSU scored 59 points in 2003 at Arizona Stadium.

California

Arizona State

Colorado

Washington State

Washington

Stanford

USC

Oregon State

UCLA (Pac-12 Championship)

Wisconsin (Rose Bowl)

Roster

2011 coaching staff

Rankings

Statistics

References

External links
 2010 Oregon Football Multimedia Guide

Oregon
Oregon Ducks football seasons
Pac-12 Conference football champion seasons
Rose Bowl champion seasons
Oregon Ducks football